Florian Nichita Haită (born 29 October 2000) is a Romanian professional footballer who plays as a winger for Liga I side Universitatea Cluj, on loan from Farul Constanța.

Club career

Viitorul Constanta
He made his league debut on 15 January 2021 in Liga I match against UTA Arad.

Career statistics

Club

References

External links
 
 

2001 births
Living people
Romanian footballers
Romania youth international footballers
Association football midfielders
Liga I players
FC Viitorul Constanța players
FCV Farul Constanța players
FC Universitatea Cluj players
Liga II players
AFC Turris-Oltul Turnu Măgurele players